Oleksandr Deriberin (born 25 February 1967) is a retired Soviet footballer and currently Ukrainian coach.

Deriberin was born in Maykop, Adyghe Autonomous Oblast, Russian SFSR, Soviet Union. From July 2011 to March 2012 he coached the clubs FC Desna Chernihiv and FC Druzhba Maykop.

External links 
 Profile at Ua-football.com site (Ukr)

Living people
1967 births
People from Maykop
Russian footballers
Soviet footballers
Ukrainian football managers
FC Zirka Kropyvnytskyi managers
FC Desna Chernihiv managers
Association football goalkeepers
FC Spartak-UGP Anapa players
Sportspeople from Adygea